Amanda Setton (born December 16, 1985) is an American actress. She is known for her recurring role as Penelope Shafai on The CW's teen drama Gossip Girl (2008–2012), for her role as Kimberly Andrews on the ABC soap opera One Life to Live (2009–2011) and as Brook Lynn Quartermaine on the ABC soap opera General Hospital. She made her Off-Broadway debut in the comedy play Love, Loss, and What I Wore in late 2011 and was on the first half of season one of the Fox comedy The Mindy Project.

Early life
Setton was born in New York City and grew up in Great Neck, where she was vice president of her high school's theater club. She is Jewish and is of both Sephardic Jewish (Syrian-Jewish) and Ashkenazi Jewish (Austrian-Jewish) descent. Setton majored in drama at Ithaca College, where she graduated in 2007. In her junior year she studied abroad in Barcelona, Spain in an IES program. Setton completed a comprehensive, two-year Meisner technique program at The Actor's Workshop of Ithaca under the instruction of Eliza VanCort.

Career
Setton played Penelope Shafai on the teen drama Gossip Girl from 2008 to 2012. She made her debut on the ABC soap opera One Life to Live as Kimberly Andrews on August 14, 2009. Setton also had small roles in the 2008 films Sex and the City and What Happens in Vegas. The website Daytime Confidential reported on February 21, 2010, that Setton had taped her last episode as Kim on One Life to Live despite being offered a contract and a pay increase.

Setton returned to Gossip Girl in 2010. It was announced on June 22, 2011, that Setton would be returning to One Life to Live as Kimberly Andrews in August 2011. On July 11, 2012, Setton was cast as a series regular on the Fox comedy series The Mindy Project, playing the role of Shauna Dicanio. However, it was reported on November 20, 2012, that her character would be written out of the show. Setton had a guest role on the pilot episode of the CBS crime drama series Golden Boy, which premiered February 26, 2013, the same day that Setton was cast in the CBS sitcom The Crazy Ones. She portrayed Dr. Mindy Shaw during the fifth season of Hawaii Five-0.

In 2019, she was cast in the role of Brook Lynn Ashton on General Hospital. She was recruited to the role by General Hospital Executive Producer Frank Valentini, who was also her former boss as EP on One Life to Live.

Personal life
Setton is married, and the couple has three children.

Filmography

Film

Television

References

External links

 

1985 births
21st-century American actresses
Actresses from New York City
American film actresses
American soap opera actresses
American stage actresses
American television actresses
Ithaca College alumni
American people of Austrian-Jewish descent
American people of Syrian-Jewish descent
Jewish American actresses
American Ashkenazi Jews
American Sephardic Jews
American Mizrahi Jews
Living people
21st-century American Jews